Scary Stories to Tell in the Dark is a series of three collections of short horror stories for children, written by Alvin Schwartz and originally illustrated by Stephen Gammell. In 2011, HarperCollins published editions featuring new art by Brett Helquist, causing mass controversy amongst fans of Gammell. Subsequent printings have restored the original Gammell art. The titles of the books are Scary Stories to Tell in the Dark (1981), More Scary Stories to Tell in the Dark (1984), and Scary Stories 3: More Tales to Chill Your Bones (1991).

The three books each feature numerous short stories in the horror genre. Author Schwartz drew heavily from folklore and urban legends as the topic of his stories, researching extensively and spending more than a year on writing each book. Acknowledged influences include William Shakespeare, T. S. Eliot, Mark Twain, Joel Chandler Harris, Bennett Cerf and Jan Harold Brunvand. The first volume was published in 1981, and the books have subsequently been collected in both a box set and a single volume. 

There is also an audiobook version of each book, read by George S. Irving. The audiobooks are presented in unabridged format with the exception of a handful of missing stories from the first book.

As of 2017, the books had collectively sold more than seven million copies, and appeared on numerous children's best-seller lists. They have collectively been hailed as a "cultural touchstone for a generation", with the original charcoal and ink artwork by Gammell often singled out for praise.

A film adaptation of the same name was released on August 23, 2019 to generally favorable reviews from critics.

Books

Editions
To celebrate the books' 30th anniversary in 2011, HarperCollins re-released the books with new illustrations from Brett Helquist. The new illustrations were generally regarded as kid-friendly and not as disturbing as their previous illustrations, resulting in widespread criticism from fans of the original. In 2017, the books were re-issued with the original artwork.

Reception

Controversy
This series is listed by the American Library Association as being the most challenged series of books from the 1990s, and seventh most challenged from the 2000s. It again made the list in 2012. Complaints have typically centered on its violence, disturbing subject matter, and potential unsuitability for younger readers, as well as religious concerns. Critics have called the stories, many of which feature macabre topics such as murder, disfigurement and cannibalism,  "sick... repulsive", and "really disgusting... not appropriate for children". The nightmarish artwork by Stephen Gammell has also been a subject of criticism. Among the groups who have attempted to have the book removed from school libraries are local parent groups and Concerned Women for America; defenders have included the American Library Association and The Bulletin of the Center for Children's Books.

Defenders of the books have claimed that they are aimed at "middle-school kids, who are perfectly able to cope with this kind of thing", and that the stories "help children deal with reality by putting faces on what they're afraid of".

Documentary 
In 2019, a documentary about the book series titled Scary Stories was released. It explores the process of the books' creation (including the artwork and the folkloric inspiration of the stories), their legacy, and the controversy surrounding attempts to ban them. It featured interviews of family members of the deceased Alvin Schwartz, as well as R. L. Stine and several other authors of 1980s and 1990s children's horror. It debuted at the Panic Fest in Kansas City.

Tribute anthology 
The Horror Writers Association compiled a new tribute anthology titled Don't Turn Out the Lights, edited by Jonathan Maberry, and featuring submissions from HWA members. It was released on September 1, 2020.

Film adaptation

In 2013, CBS Films acquired the rights to the Scary Stories to Tell in the Dark books from 1212 Entertainment who initially optioned the material. The script (initially written by John August) was ultimately credited to Dan and Kevin Hageman, with Guillermo del Toro, Marcus Dunstan and Patrick Melton receiving a "story by" credit.

Del Toro produced the film along with Sean Daniel, Jason Brown, and Elizabeth Grave, with Roberto Grande and Joshua Long executive producing. Michael Garza, Austin Abrams, Gabriel Rush, Austin Zajur and Natalie Ganzhorn were cast, with André Øvredal directing.

The film was released on August 23, 2019, by Lionsgate and CBS Films.

See also
 In a Dark, Dark Room and Other Scary Stories
 Scary Stories for Sleep-overs
 Tales for the Midnight Hour
 Short & Shivery

References

Series of children's books
1981 children's books
1981 short story collections
American folklore
Ghost stories
Horror short story collections
Children's short story collections
Harper & Row books
Urban legends
Children's books adapted into films
Short stories adapted into films